FIFA 22 is a football simulation video game published by Electronic Arts. It is the 29th installment in the FIFA series, and was released worldwide on 1 October 2021 for Nintendo Switch, PlayStation 4, PlayStation 5, Stadia, Windows, Xbox One, and Xbox Series X/S. Players who pre-ordered the ultimate edition, however, received four days of early access and were able to play the game from 27 September.

Kylian Mbappé is the cover athlete for the second consecutive year.

In response to the 2022 Russian invasion of Ukraine, EA removed Russian national teams from all versions (since 1.22 patch) of its football video games, and made Russian and Belarusian players ineligible for FIFA 22.

Features

HyperMotion Technology 

FIFA 22 introduces "HyperMotion Technology,” which uses motion capture data collected from 22 real-life players playing a complete, high-intensity football match in motion capture suits. The data collected from player movements, tackles, aerial duels and on-ball actions is used to power FIFA 22 gameplay. According to an EA Sports press release, FIFA 22 uses this data in its machine learning algorithm which uses over “8.7 million frames of advanced match capture” to generate life-like player movements and animations on and off the ball in real time. This "HyperMotion" feature is only available on the 9th Generation and Stadia versions of the game, and has given rise to the slogan "Powered By Football."

Career mode 
A single player “career mode” is featured in FIFA 22, where the user can play as a player or manager throughout a 15-year career. FIFA 22 introduces a create-a-club option in manager career, allowing players to design a new club with customized kits, crest, and home stadium. Career mode introduces a level feature  where users can advance their player by collecting experience points that unlock player skills and “perks” to improve stats.

Ultimate Team 

FIFA 22 Ultimate Team is a game mode where users can create a team and play online or offline games to earn various cards like “FUT Heroes” to add to their team. FIFA 22 Ultimate Team introduced "FUT Heroes" cards that represent different players with special ratings and attributes. The full heroes card list includes: Mario Gómez, Tim Cahill, Diego Milito, Jorge Campos, Fernando Morientes, Sami Al-Jaber, Robbie Keane, Abedi Pelé, Lars Ricken, Ole Gunnar Solskjær, Antonio Di Natale, Iván Córdoba, Freddie Ljungberg, Jürgen Kohler, Jerzy Dudek, Aleksandr Mostovoi, Joe Cole and David Ginola.

Card Kinds 
Bronze Common & Rare
COMNEBOL Libertadores & Copa Sudamericana
Silver Common & Rare
Gold Common & Rare
FUT Heroes
Shapeshifters
Team Of The Year (TOTY)
Team Of The Season (TOTS)
Adidas Numbers-Up
Domestic Man Of The Match
POTM (Serie A, Ligue 1, Laliga Santander etc.)
Team Of The Week
TOTS TOKEN
SHAPESHIFTERS TOKEN
SHAPESHIFTERS Heros
FUT BIRTHDAY TOKEN
FUT Birthday
FUT Future Stars
Rulebreakers
FUT VS ICE
FUT VS FIRE
Road To The Finals
Road To The Knockouts
Team Of The Group Stage (TOTGS)
Flashback
FUT Fantasy Upgrade
FUT Fantasy
Silver Stars
FUT Captains
FUT Captain Heroes
Futties
Summer Swaps Tokens
Summer Swaps Tokens
FGS Swaps
Icons
Prime Icon Moments

In order to keep the users of the game entertained, promotions of the cards of the players are applied. These promotions are made when there are important events worldwide such as Christmas or Halloween. However, there are also promotions regarding events in the FIFA community such as the UEFA Champions League, UEFA Europa League or UEFA Conference League. Two of the most important promotions in the video game season are the team of the year (TOTY) where the best 12 players of the year are celebrated and the team of the season (TOTS) where the best players of the most advanced leagues are celebrated. important in the world. All of these promotions include improvements to player statistics, from physical attributes to sports attributes such as skill moves stars.

As in FIFA 21, notable former players are given "icon" cards, similar to "FUT Heroes". New players added for FIFA 22 include Iker Casillas, Robin van Persie, Wayne Rooney and Cafu. Players have the option to preview Silver and Gold player packs as in the previous game, by allowing players to preview what they would receive from a pack before deciding whether to purchase it. "Icon" cards are classified as extremely rare, the probability of getting one from a player pack is below 1%.

VOLTA Football
New VOLTA mechanics in FIFA 22 will allow players to trigger special abilities during a match that would boost a player's avatar in a specific attribute. There will be three Signature Abilities available: Power Strike, Pure Pace and Aggressive Tackle. Players of FIFA 22 will also have the opportunity to play with up to three players in various online mini game modes, which will be part of the new VOLTA Arcade.

Pro Clubs 
Pro Clubs is a game mode where players are able to create their own virtual character, to take part in 11v11 online matches. Players can play with up to 10 other friends in an online match where each player controls their own virtual characters on the pitch. Players can also adjust the physical stature of their avatars, which has an effect on in-game abilities. A taller avatar, for example, would generally have a lower running speed than a shorter avatar. Pro Clubs avatars also improve over time as they play more games and perform well in matches. Players also have the ability to change a variety of features about their team, such as the team's crest, kits, and the stadium appearance.

Player Traits 
Traits are qualities a player possesses that affect their behaviors in-game. Each trait has a specific function that relies on how the player is controlled, either by the user or computer. Traits are divided into four different categories: Standard traits, CPU AI traits, Career Mode traits, and VOLTA Football traits. The Standard traits influence the user's and CPU's control over the player, these traits consist of different kinds of shots, throw-ins, passing skills, dribbling skills, and player health. CPU AI traits offer similar skills compared to the Standard traits however, only influence the player when the computer controls them. Career Mode and VOLTA Football traits only impact the player in their respective game modes.

Licenses
The game features more than 30 officially licensed leagues, more than 700 clubs,  and more than 17,000 players. For the first time, the Indian Super League and its eleven teams were added, as well as the UEFA Europa Conference League, the third tier of European club football established in 2021. New stadiums added in the game include the Estádio da Luz, home of S.L. Benfica, the Estádio do Dragão home of FC Porto, and the Nuevo Mirandilla, home of Cádiz CF. Additionally, in January 2022 via an update, the Brentford Community Stadium, home of Brentford, was added to the game, thus ensuring all 20 Premier League teams have their respective stadiums.

Juventus, Roma, Atalanta and Lazio are not featured in FIFA 22 due to licensing issues, and are instead known as Piemonte Calcio, Roma FC, Bergamo Calcio and Latium respectively. The game retains the players' likenesses, but the official badge, kits and stadiums are replaced with custom designs and generic stadiums created by EA Sports. Bayern Munich and Barcelona are also featured in the game with licensed players and kits, but do not have their stadium licenses and thus play in generic stadiums.

Following a November 2020 announcement by Canadian actor Ryan Reynolds and American actor Rob McElhenney, through the RR McReynolds Company LLC, that they would be taking over the club, Wrexham A.F.C. were included as part of the "Rest of World" section, becoming the first non-league team to be featured in the series. Wrexham's last appearance in the FIFA series was in FIFA 08, when they were relegated from League 2 to the National League.

Removals
In February 2022, EA Sports announced that the teams from the Russian Premier League and the Russia national football team will be removed from FIFA 22, FIFA Online and FIFA Mobile amidst the country's invasion of Ukraine. The announcement comes following the FIFA and the UEFA bans on Russian teams from competitions of both FIFA and UEFA on March 1, 2022. This came just weeks after EA removed Mason Greenwood from the game in light of sexual abuse allegations against the Manchester United forward (the player did not appear in any match since his arrest). In March 2022, EA suspended Diego Maradona from FIFA 22 following a legal dispute which claimed EA had negotiated with the wrong party and therefore did not have the rights to use his likeness.

Japan's women national squad has also been removed.

Commentators
The English-language version of the game features two new commentators. Stewart Robson replaces Lee Dixon as co-commentator to Derek Rae, while Alex Scott replaces Alan McInally in the role of providing in-game score updates in Career Mode. Scott is a former Arsenal women's team player before retiring in 2018 when she became a pundit on Sky Sports and Match of the Day. Robson has made 150 appearances for Arsenal during his playing career before he retired to join Arsenal's media team and work as a commentator for various media outlets.

Soundtrack

Release

Editions 
FIFA 22 is available as two editions, a Standard Edition and an Ultimate Edition. Whilst previous games in the series have included a Champions Edition, FIFA 22 does not have one. Players who pre-ordered the Ultimate Edition were granted a variety of bonuses plus four days of early access.

Standard Edition 
The standard edition of FIFA 22 has a price of $59.99 on previous generation consoles such as PS4 and Xbox One; and a price of $69.99 on new generation consoles such as PS5 and Xbox Series X. Players who pre-ordered the standard edition were entitled to the following bonuses:

 Team of the Week 1 Player Item
 Kylian Mbappe Loan Item
 FUT Ambassador Loan Player Pick
 Career Mode Homegrown Talent

Ultimate Edition 
The ultimate edition of FIFA 22 released with a price of $99.99 on all consoles. Players who pre-ordered the ultimate edition were entitled to the same bonuses as the standard edition, plus the following benefits:

 Untradeable ‘Ones to Watch’ Player Item
 4,600 FIFA Points
 Dual Entitlement: Free upgrade to new generation consoles
 Four Days of Early Access

Ambassadors 
FIFA ambassadors are normally well-known current or retired players that are featured on the cover, loading screens, in Ultimate Team packs and in advertising campaigns. Son Heung-Min, David Alaba, Christian Pulisic, Phil Foden, Alphonso Davies and Trent Alexander-Arnold were named as the official ambassadors of the game. Television presenter and singer Yūka Kageyama was appointed ambassador for the Japanese market.

Reception

Sales 
77% percent of FIFA 22 sales were digital downloads during the first week after its release, which is a significant jump from 62% for last year's installment in the franchise, FIFA 21. As of December 2021, EA stated that over 9 million copies of FIFA 22 were sold worldwide, with more than 460 million matches played. Data analytics firm, GFK, stated that FIFA 22 was the top-selling game in 17 out of 19 European nations covered within their research, with Mario Kart 8 Deluxe following closely behind.

Awards

Reviews 
FIFA 22 received "generally favorable" reviews for the PlayStation 5, Xbox Series X, and PC versions of the game, according to review aggregator Metacritic. The Nintendo Switch version, however, was widely panned by critics due to being largely unchanged from its predecessor, FIFA 21 (which itself was largely unchanged from FIFA 20 and FIFA 19). In a review of the game by Bleacher Report, FIFA 22 was said to be the franchise's best release in years with its HyperMotion feature. Some of those improvements include players reacting to impacts from strong passes and more agile players being noticeably more flexible and swift. Moreover, the popular video game review website, IGN, states that FIFA 22 takes advantage of the graphical power of new generation consoles with deeper and more immersive visual effects. IGN also stated that the FIFA 22 soundtrack was one of the most comprehensive playlists in recent years.

Criticism 
In a report from the Norwegian Consumer Council, the use of loot box mechanics in FIFA 22 was examined as a case study.

The report was highly critical of the system, for instance estimating that to get a Team of the Year Kylian Mbappé promo card, on average the player would have to purchase a grand
total of 847 Jumbo Rare Player Packs, spending nearly 1.7 million FIFA Points, or roughly €13,500. It also stated that if the player wanted to aim for this card without spending real life money, the player would have to play continually for over three years to earn enough points to buy the average number of packs needed.

After examining some of the mechanisms used in the game to incentivize players to make in-game purchases, the report stated that "It appears obvious that the design and mechanisms driving in-game purchases
in these games are predatory, manipulative, and exceedingly aggressive, targeting consumer vulnerabilities at every opportunity".

Professional tournaments 
FIFA 22 Global Series is a series of online tournaments hosted by EA Sports. The tournaments are held exclusively on PlayStation 5 where players participate in teams of one or two for in-game rewards and cash prizes. In order to qualify for the tournament, users must compete in their respective regions for high standings in the leaderboard or compete in Global Series Opens. Global Series Opens are tournaments that host the highest ranked players in their regions with winners getting cash prizes from $3,500–$10,000.

See also 

 Pro Evolution Soccer
 List of best-selling video game franchises

References

External links

 

2021 video games
22
Association football video games
Women's association football video games
EA Sports games
Video games developed in Canada
Video games developed in Romania
Video games set in 2021
Video games set in 2022
Video games set in Europe
Video games set in Portugal
Nintendo Switch games
PlayStation 4 games
PlayStation 4 Pro enhanced games
PlayStation 5 games
Stadia games
Windows games
Xbox One games
Xbox Series X and Series S games
Frostbite (game engine) games
Sports video games with career mode